Siddheswari Devi (1908 – 18 March 1977) was a legendary Hindustani singer from Varanasi, India, known as Maa (mother). Born in 1908, she lost her parents early and was brought up by her aunt, the noted singer Rajeshwari Devi.

Initiation into music
Despite living in a musical household, Siddheswari came to music by accident. 
Rajeshwari had arranged musical training for her own daughter, Kamleshwari, while Siddheswari would do small chores around the house.  
Once, while the noted sarangi player Siyaji Mishra was teaching Kamleshwari, she was unable to repeat the tappa that she was being taught.  Rajeshwari ran out of patience, and started to cane Kamleshwari, who cried out for help.

The only person to help her was her close friend Siddheswari, who ran from the kitchen to hug her cousin, and took the thrashing on her own body.  At this point, Siddheswari told her weeping cousin, "It's not so difficult to sing what Siyaji Maharaj was telling you."  Siddheswari then showed her how to sing it, performing the whole tune perfectly, much to the amazement of everyone.

The next day, Siyaji Maharaj came to Rajeshwari, and asked to adopt Siddheswari into his own family (they were childless).  So Siddheswari moved in with the couple, eventually becoming a great friend and support for them.

This moving incident was very vivid in Siddheswari's mind, and is detailed in the biography Maa co-authored by her daughter Savita Devi.

Musical career
Subsequently, she also trained under Rajab Ali Khan of Dewas and Inayat Khan of Lahore, but considered her guru mainly Bade Ramdas.

She sang khyal, thumri (her forte) and short classical forms as dadra, chaiti, kajri etc.   On several occasions she would sing perform through the night, for example on the overnight boating expeditions of Maharaja of Darbhanga.

The Carnatic singer M. S. Subbulakshmi learned bhajan singing from Siddheshwari Devi to widen her repertoire to include an occasional Hindi bhajan, in particular for her concerts to larger audiences across India. In 1989, noted director Mani Kaul made an award-winning documentary, Siddheshwari, on her life

She won many accolades during her career, including: 
 Padma Shri by the Government of India (1966)
 Honorary D.Lit. degree by the Ravindra Bharati Vishwavidyalaya in Kolkata (1973)
 Deshikottam degree by the Vishwa Bharati Vishwavidyalaya.

She died on 18 March 1977 in New Delhi. Her daughter Savita Devi is also a musician and lives in Delhi.

References

External links
Short biography at Underscore Records
 Fragments of her music can be heard from the collection at The Sangeet Kendra, Ahmedabad: 
 Picture at Kamat's Potpourri

1908 births
1977 deaths
Hindustani singers
Recipients of the Padma Shri in arts
Recipients of the Sangeet Natak Akademi Award
Thumri
Musicians from Varanasi
Indian women classical singers
20th-century Indian singers
Women Hindustani musicians
Singers from Uttar Pradesh
20th-century Indian women singers
Women musicians from Uttar Pradesh